Daniel Avramovski (born 20 February 1995) is a Macedonian professional footballer who plays as a midfielder for Bosnian Premier League club Sarajevo.

Club career

Rabotnički
Born in Skopje, Avramovski played with FK Rabotnički and FK Makedonija Gjorče Petrov in the First Macedonian Football League. While with Rabotnički, Avramovski developed a reputation which brought the attention of several European clubs, and in February 2012 was invited to a ten-day trial with Liverpool.

Red Star Belgrade
In July 2014 he signed a three-year contract with Serbian side Red Star Belgrade. On 30 August 2014, Avramovski scored on his debut with Red Star, scoring the only goal in the 1–0 win against FK Spartak Subotica just ten minutes after coming on as a substitute.

Avramovski was loaned to OFK Beograd, where he made 22 league and 2 cup appearances in the 2015–16 season.

In summer 2016, Avramovski returned in Red Star Belgrade, and he was licensed for Second qualifying round of the 2016–17 UEFA Europa League season. After some injury problems, he failed to play, and spent the rest of a year without any official matches for the club. As he was not licensed for the Serbian SuperLiga already, Avramovski terminated his contract and left the club in December of the same year.

Olimpija Ljubljana
On 20 December 2016, Avramovski moved to Slovenia, and signed three-and-a-half year deal with Olimpija Ljubljana.

Loan to Vojvodina
On the last day of the Serbian summer transfer window, Avramovski signed a one-year loan deal, with the option of buyout, with Vojvodina.

International career
On 18 June 2014 he made his debut for the Macedonian national team at the age of 19 in a 2–0 friendly loss against the Chinese national team.

Career statistics

Club

International

References

External links
Daniel Avramovski stats at utakmica.rs

1995 births
Living people
Footballers from Skopje
Association football midfielders
Macedonian footballers
North Macedonia youth international footballers
North Macedonia under-21 international footballers
North Macedonia international footballers
FK Rabotnički players
FK Makedonija Gjorče Petrov players
Red Star Belgrade footballers
OFK Beograd players
NK Olimpija Ljubljana (2005) players
FK Vojvodina players
FK Vardar players
Kayserispor footballers
FK Sarajevo players
Macedonian First Football League players
Serbian SuperLiga players
Slovenian PrvaLiga players
Süper Lig players
Premier League of Bosnia and Herzegovina players
UEFA Euro 2020 players
Macedonian expatriate footballers
Expatriate footballers in Serbia
Macedonian expatriate sportspeople in Serbia
Expatriate footballers in Slovenia
Macedonian expatriate sportspeople in Slovenia
Expatriate footballers in Turkey
Macedonian expatriate sportspeople in Turkey
Expatriate footballers in Bosnia and Herzegovina
Macedonian expatriate sportspeople in Bosnia and Herzegovina